Tetyushi is the name of several inhabited localities in Russia.

Urban localities
Tetyushi, Republic of Tatarstan, a town in Tetyushsky District of the Republic of Tatarstan

Rural localities
Tetyushi, Republic of Mordovia, a selo in Bolshemanadyshsky Selsoviet of Atyashevsky District in the Republic of Mordovia; 
Tetyushi, Nizhny Novgorod Oblast, a village in Bolshearsky Selsoviet of Lukoyanovsky District in Nizhny Novgorod Oblast;